Hymenobacter gummosus is a Gram-negative, aerobic and motile  bacterium from the genus of Hymenobacter which has been isolated from wather from the Longtoushan Spring in Taiwan.

References 

gummosus
Bacteria described in 2017